SMB1 may refer to:

Super Mario Bros., a 1985 video game
Server Message Block version 1, a network protocol

See also 
 SMB (disambiguation)